Wacław Franciszek Sierpiński (14 March 1882 – 21 October 1969) was a Polish mathematician. He was known for contributions to set theory (research on the axiom of choice and the continuum hypothesis), number theory, theory of functions, and topology. He published over 700 papers and 50 books.

Three well-known fractals are named after him (the Sierpiński triangle, the Sierpiński carpet, and the Sierpiński curve), as are Sierpiński numbers and the associated Sierpiński problem.

Educational background

Sierpiński enrolled in the Department of Mathematics and Physics at the University of Warsaw in 1899 and graduated four years later. In 1903, while still at the University of Warsaw, the Department of Mathematics and Physics offered a prize for the best essay from a student on Voronoy's contribution to number theory. Sierpiński was awarded a gold medal for his essay, thus laying the foundation for his first major mathematical contribution. Unwilling for his work to be published in Russian, he withheld it until 1907, when it was published in Samuel Dickstein's mathematical magazine 'Prace Matematyczno-Fizyczne' (Polish: 'The Works of Mathematics and Physics').

After his graduation in 1904, Sierpiński worked as a school teacher of mathematics and physics in Warsaw. However, when the school closed because of a strike, Sierpiński decided to go to Kraków to pursue a doctorate. At the Jagiellonian University in Kraków, he attended lectures by Stanisław Zaremba on mathematics. He also studied astronomy and philosophy. He received his doctorate and was appointed to the University of Lwów in 1908.

Career

In 1907 Sierpiński first became interested in set theory when he came across a theorem which stated that points in the plane could be specified with a single coordinate. He wrote to Tadeusz Banachiewicz (then at Göttingen), asking how such a result was possible. He received the one-word reply 'Cantor'. Sierpiński began to study set theory and, in 1909, he gave the first ever lecture course devoted entirely to the subject.

Sierpiński maintained an output of research papers and books. During the years 1908 to 1914, when he taught at the University of Lwów, he published three books in addition to many research papers. These books were  The Theory of Irrational Numbers (1910), Outline of Set Theory (1912), and The Theory of Numbers (1912).

When World War I began in 1914, Sierpiński and his family were in Russia. To avoid the persecution that was common for Polish foreigners, Sierpiński spent the rest of the war years in Moscow working with Nikolai Luzin. Together they began the study of analytic sets. In 1916, Sierpiński gave the first example of an absolutely normal number.

When World War I ended in 1918, Sierpiński returned to Lwów. However shortly after taking up his appointment again in Lwów he was offered a post at the University of Warsaw, which he accepted. In 1919 he was promoted to a professor. He spent the rest of his life in Warsaw.

During the Polish–Soviet War (1919–1921), Sierpiński helped break Soviet Russian ciphers for the Polish General Staff's cryptologic agency.

In 1920, Sierpiński, together with Zygmunt Janiszewski and his former student Stefan Mazurkiewicz, founded the mathematical journal Fundamenta Mathematicae. Sierpiński edited the journal, which specialized in papers on set theory.

During this period, Sierpiński worked predominantly on set theory, but also on point set topology and functions of a real variable. In set theory he made contributions on the axiom of choice and on the continuum hypothesis. He proved that Zermelo–Fraenkel set theory together with the Generalized continuum hypothesis imply the Axiom of choice. He also worked on what is now known as the Sierpiński curve. Sierpiński continued to collaborate with Luzin on investigations of analytic and projective sets. His work on functions of a real variable includes results on functional series, differentiability of functions and Baire's classification.

Sierpiński retired in 1960 as professor at the University of Warsaw, but continued until 1967 to give a seminar on the Theory of Numbers at the Polish Academy of Sciences. He also continued editorial work as editor-in-chief of Acta Arithmetica, and as a member of the editorial board of Rendiconti del Circolo Matematico di Palermo, Composito Matematica, and Zentralblatt für Mathematik.

In 1964 he was one of the signatories of the so-called Letter of 34 to Prime Minister Józef Cyrankiewicz regarding freedom of culture.

Sierpiński is interred at the Powązki Cemetery in Warsaw, Poland.

Honors received
Honorary Degrees: Lwów (1929), St. Marks of Lima (1930), Tarta (1931), Amsterdam (1932), Sofia (1939), Prague (1947), Wrocław (1947), Lucknow (1949), and Moscow (1967).

For high involvement with the development of mathematics in Poland, Sierpiński was honored with election to the Polish Academy of Learning in 1921 and that same year was made dean of the faculty at the University of Warsaw. In 1928, he became vice-chairman of the Warsaw Scientific Society, and that same year was elected chairman of the Polish Mathematical Society.

He was elected to the Geographic Society of Lima (1931), the Royal Scientific Society of Liège (1934), the Bulgarian Academy of Sciences (1936), the National Academy of Lima (1939), the Royal Society of Sciences of Naples (1939), the Accademia dei Lincei of Rome (1947), the Germany Academy of Sciences (1950), the American Academy of Arts and Sciences (1959), the Paris Academy (1960), the Royal Dutch Academy (1961), the Academy of Science of Brussels (1961), the London Mathematical Society (1964), the Romanian Academy (1965) and the Papal Academy of Sciences (1967).

In 1949 Sierpiński was awarded Poland's Scientific Prize, first degree.

Publications 
Sierpiński authored 724 papers and 50 books, almost all in Polish. His book Cardinal and Ordinal Numbers was originally published in English in 1958. Two books, Introduction to General Topology (1934) and General Topology (1952) were translated into English by Canadian mathematician Cecilia Krieger.
Another book, Pythagorean Triangles (1954), was translated into English by Indian mathematician Ambikeshwar Sharma, published in 1962, and republished by Dover Books in 2003; it also has a Russian translation. Another work of his published in English is the Elementary Theory of Numbers (translated by A. Hulanicki in 1964), based on his Polish Teoria Liczb (1914 and 1959). Another book, named "250 Problems in Elementary Number Theory" was translated into English (1970) and Russian (1968).

See also
 Arity theorem
 List of Poles
 Menger sponge
 Seventeen or Bust
 Sierpiński carpet
 Sierpiński's constant
 Sierpiński curve
 Sierpiński game
 Sierpiński number
 Sierpiński set
 Sierpiński space
 Sierpiński triangle
 The Sierpiński moon crater

References

External links
 
 
 
 
 
 Several of Sierpiński's books, Biblioteka Wirtualna Nauki.
 Sierpiński: Fractals, Code Breaking, and a Crater on the Moon

1882 births
1969 deaths
Warsaw School of Mathematics
People from Warsaw Governorate
Number theorists
Topologists
Members of the Polish Academy of Learning
Burials at Powązki Cemetery
Cipher Bureau (Poland)
Jagiellonian University alumni
University of Warsaw alumni
Academic staff of the University of Warsaw
Members of the Polish Academy of Sciences
Members of the Bulgarian Academy of Sciences
Members of the French Academy of Sciences
Members of the Royal Netherlands Academy of Arts and Sciences
Members of the German Academy of Sciences at Berlin
Recipients of the State Award Badge (Poland)
Foreign members of the Serbian Academy of Sciences and Arts